Gerard Hugh "Leo" Sayer (born 21 May 1948) is an English-Australian singer and songwriter who has been active since 1973. He has been an Australian citizen and resident since 2009.

Sayer launched his career in the United Kingdom in the early 1970s, and he became a top singles and album act on both sides of the Atlantic in the 1970s. His first seven hit singles in the United Kingdom all reached the Top 10 – a feat first accomplished by his first manager, Adam Faith. His songs have been sung by other notable artists, including Cliff Richard ("Dreaming"), Roger Daltrey, and Three Dog Night.

Early life
Sayer was born and brought up in Shoreham-by-Sea in Sussex to Thomas E.G. Sayer and the former Theresa Nolan as the second of three sons (Michael was born in 1939 and Brian in 1951). His father was English and his mother was born in Maguiresbridge in County Fermanagh in Northern Ireland and raised on her father's small farm at Edenmore, a townland near the hamlet of Killesher, also in County Fermanagh. Sayer attended St Peter's Catholic Primary School in Shoreham-by-Sea and then Blessed Robert Southwell (now St Oscar Romero Catholic School) in Goring-by-Sea, before studying commercial art and graphic design at West Sussex College of Art and Design in Worthing, Sussex. 

Sayer was initially discovered by musician David Courtney who then co-managed and co-produced him with former pop singer Adam Faith. In January 1967, while 18-year-old Sayer was working as a hall porter at the King's Hotel in Hove, he assisted in the rescue of elderly guests from a serious fire that damaged the hotel's first floor. He himself was rescued from the blazing hotel by builders working on a block of flats beside the hotel.

Career
Sayer began his music career co-writing songs with David Courtney, including "Giving It All Away", which gave Roger Daltrey of the Who his first solo hit in 1973. The same year, Sayer began his career as a recording artist under the management of Adam Faith, who signed Sayer to the Chrysalis label in the United Kingdom and Warner Bros. Records in the United States.

His debut single, "Why Is Everybody Going Home", failed to chart, but he achieved national prominence in the United Kingdom with his second single, the music hall-styled song "The Show Must Go On", which Sayer performed on British television wearing a pierrot costume and makeup. The single went to No. 2 on the United Kingdom singles chart, as did his debut album, Silverbird, co-written with David Courtney who also co-produced the album with Adam Faith. Three Dog Night's cover, the group's last Billboard Hot 100 top 10 record, reached No. 4 on 25 May 1974.

His subsequent singles were all major hits in the United Kingdom"One Man Band" went to No. 6 in 1974, "Long Tall Glasses" (UK No. 4, 1974) became his first Top Ten hit in the United States, reaching No. 9, and "Moonlighting" went to No. 2 in the United Kingdom in 1975. In 1976, Sayer recorded three Beatles songs, "I Am the Walrus", "Let It Be" and "The Long and Winding Road", for the Beatles-themed concept film All This and World War II. His albums in this period were also consistently successful in the United Kingdom: he scored five consecutive Top 10 placings on the United Kingdom album chart between 1973 and 1977.

He also garnered success as an album artist in the United States, beginning with his second LP Just A Boy (1974), which reached No. 16. His fourth album Endless Flight (1976) consolidated his international popularity, reaching No. 4 in the United Kingdom and No. 10 in the United States; it also charted strongly in other countries including Sweden, Norway, the Netherlands, and New Zealand, and was certified as a platinum album in both the United Kingdom and the United States, and double-platinum in Canada.

The peak of his career came in 1977, when he achieved two consecutive number one hits in the United States, first with the disco-styled "You Make Me Feel Like Dancing" (a Grammy Award winner for the year's best Rhythm and Blues Song), followed by a romantic ballad, "When I Need You" (1977), which reached number one in both the United Kingdom and United States. Written by Albert Hammond and Carole Bayer Sager, it was Sayer's first No. 1 single in the United Kingdom (after three number two hits). It was also the first of two chart-toppers in a row in the United Kingdom for producer Richard Perry. Also from Endless Flight, Sayer covered the Danny O'Keefe song "Magdalena", which served as the B-side to the "You Make Me Feel Like Dancing" single version.

In 1979, the compilation album The Very Best of Leo Sayer (originally released by Chrysalis in the UK and elsewhere, with its first release in the US in 2000 by Rhino Records with different cover art) became Sayer's first United Kingdom No. 1 LP and his seventh consecutive United Kingdom Top 20 album. Sayer also guest-starred in the second episode of the third season of The Muppet Show, and performed "You Make Me Feel Like Dancing", "The Show Must Go On", and "When I Need You".

Sayer also made cover versions of Bobby Vee's Sonny Curtis-Jerry Allison composition "More Than I Can Say" (his fourth UK No. 2 hit and US #2), and Buddy Holly's "Raining in My Heart" (1979) and the brothers Gibb's Heart (Stop Beating in Time)" in 1982. In the United States, three of his singles"You Make Me Feel Like Dancing" (1977), "When I Need You" (1977) and "More Than I Can Say" (1980)were certified gold.

Sayer provided songs for the soundtrack of the French–Belgian animated film The Missing Link (Le Chainon manquant) in 1980. In 1981, he voiced Dan the forest ranger in The Raccoons on Ice, the second of four specials serving as a predecessor to the Canadian animated series The Raccoons. He also sang several songs for the special, all of which were included on the 1983 album Lake Freeze and the 1984 album The Raccoons: Let's Dance! 

In 1990, he contributed to the last studio collaboration between Alan Parsons and Eric Woolfson, Woolfson's solo album Freudiana, performing "I Am A Mirror". Sayer performed at the Sanremo Music Festival in 1990, with "The Moth And The Flame" (English version of "Tu... sì" by Mango) and, in 1991, with "All Alone" (English version of "Dubbi No" by Mietta).

Financial difficulties
After a decade of success, Sayer's career suffered repeated setbacks due to a series of financial and legal problems. When Sayer and his first wife Janice divorced in 1985, subsequent financial disclosure revealed Adam Faith had badly mishandled his business affairs and that much of the millions of pounds he had earned over the previous decade had been lost through Faith's questionable investments and business expenses.

Sayer sued Faith for mismanagement and the case was eventually settled out of court in 1992, with Sayer receiving a reported payout of £650,000. In the early 1990s, his career stalled again while he fought a protracted but ultimately successful legal battle against his former label, Chrysalis, to regain the publishing rights to his songs.

In 1996, Sayer sued his new management, after he discovered that his pension fund had allegedly been mismanaged to around £1 million. Despite spending more than £90,000 in legal fees the case never made it to court and Sayer abandoned the suit for reasons of cost. He assembled a band led by former Van Morrison guitarist Ronnie Johnson and toured his way back to financial security. They recorded a live album, Live in London, which was released in 1999.

Later career

On 12 February 2006, Sayer made a return to number one in the UK Singles Chart, with DJ Meck's remix of "Thunder In My Heart". It was his first appearance in the United Kingdom Top 10 for almost twenty-four years, and his second chart-topper in the United Kingdom, almost three decades after his first. Leo Sayer: At His Very Best, a career spanning compilation album, was released in the United Kingdom on 6 March 2006. It featured the Meck single, alongside "When I Need You" and "You Make Me Feel Like Dancing".

In June 2008, Sayer released a new album only in Australia, Don't Wait Until Tomorrow. This album, produced by Garth Porter (from the Australian pop band Sherbet) and released by Universal Music Australia, features selections from his catalog rearranged with strings and acoustic and jazz instrumentation.

In January 2009, Sayer became an Australian citizen, having lived in Sydney since 2005.

Sayer has appeared in various television shows in addition to The Muppet Show including the 1998 Vic and Bob game show Families at War (on which he performed "When I Need You" while given a piggyback by a contestant running on a treadmill); The Wiggles 2008 DVD, You Make Me Feel Like Dancing, which featured Sayer's hit of the same name; Celebrity Big Brother UK in 2007; and the Australian television comedy, Stupid, Stupid Man.

In January 2015, Sayer released his album, Restless Years, and toured Australia and Singapore, with various support acts including Jason Ayres. In January 2015, Sayer also featured in Singapore's Leo Sayer in Concert – 40 Years at the Top, presented by the British Theatre Playhouse. In October 2015, Sayer was awarded with a Gold Badge of Merit from the British Academy of Songwriters, Composers and Authors.

On 3 May 2019, Sayer released his latest album, Selfie on Demon Records. It was recorded at his home studio at The Barn in Plainland, Queensland, Australia.

Personal life
Sayer and his wife Janice married in 1973 and divorced in 1985. He then had a relationship with Donatella Piccinetti, with whom he moved to live in Australia, but they separated in 2007. Sayer resides in the Southern Highlands of New South Wales.  

In January 2009, Sayer became an Australian citizen at the Australia Day citizenship ceremony in Canberra. In 2020 he became an ambassador for the Canberra Hospital Foundation.

Health problems
Sayer is dyslexic. He still suffers from the effects of injuries to his legs and ankles that were caused by a fall off a stage in 1977.
 
Sayer's family has a history of cancer; both his parents died of cancer as did other family members on both sides. On his 65th birthday, after experiencing intestinal problems, Sayer was given a colonoscopy which revealed he had intestinal ulcers and a tumour. He underwent surgery which successfully treated both problems and said that the tumour was benign.

Discography

Silverbird (1973)
Just a Boy (1974)
Another Year (1975)
Endless Flight (1976)
Thunder in My Heart (1977)
Leo Sayer (1978)
Here (1979)
Living in a Fantasy (1980)
World Radio (1982)
Have You Ever Been in Love (1983)
Cool Touch (1990)
Voice in My Head (2004)
Don't Wait Until Tomorrow (2008)
Restless Years (2015)
Selfie (2019)
Northern Songs (2022)

References

External links

 
 

1948 births
Living people
British harmonica players
British soft rock musicians
English emigrants to Australia
English people of Irish descent
English Roman Catholics
English male singer-songwriters
Grammy Award winners
Naturalised citizens of Australia
Musicians with dyslexia
People from Shoreham-by-Sea
Chrysalis Records artists
Warner Records artists